Hemiplatytes prosenes is a moth in the family Crambidae. It was described by Harrison Gray Dyar Jr. in 1912. It has been recorded from the US states of California, Colorado and Utah.

The wingspan is about 22 mm. Adults are on wing from June to September.

References

Ancylolomiini
Moths described in 1912
Moths of North America